The 2000 NBA All-Star Game was an exhibition basketball game which was played on February 13, 2000, at The Arena in Oakland in Oakland, California, home of the Golden State Warriors. This game was the 49th edition of the North American National Basketball Association (NBA) All-Star Game and was played during the 1999–2000 NBA season. The 1998–99 edition was canceled due to the NBA lockout.

The Western Conference won the game with the score of 137–126 while Shaquille O'Neal and Tim Duncan were both named MVP of the game. O'Neal took the All Star MVP trophy saying to Duncan, "you already have one of those rings" (referring to the championship ring Duncan received due to his membership on the 1998–99 San Antonio Spurs team with David Robinson and Gregg Popovich), "so I'm taking the trophy." Allen Iverson was the leading scorer of the game with 26 points.

All-Star Game

Coaches

The coach for the Western Conference team was Los Angeles Lakers head coach Phil Jackson. The Lakers had a 37–11 record on February 13. The coach for the Eastern Conference team was New York Knicks head coach Jeff Van Gundy. The Knicks had a 29-18 record on February 13.

Players

The rosters for the All-Star Game were chosen in two ways. The starters were chosen via a fan ballot. Two guards, two forwards and one center who received the highest vote were named the All-Star starters. The reserves were chosen by votes among the NBA head coaches in their respective conferences. The coaches were not permitted to vote for their own players. The reserves consist of two guards, two forwards, one center and two players regardless of position. If a player is unable to participate due to injury, the commissioner will select a replacement.

Vince Carter of the Toronto Raptors topped the ballots with 1,911,973 votes, which earned him a starting position as a forward in the Eastern Conference team. Allen Iverson, Eddie Jones, Grant Hill, and Alonzo Mourning completed the Eastern Conference starting position. This was the first All-Star appearance by Carter and Iverson, and Hill's fifth consecutive start as an All-Star. The Eastern Conference reserves included five first-time selections, Allan Houston, Ray Allen, Glenn Robinson, Jerry Stackhouse, and Dale Davis. Reggie Miller, and Dikembe Mutombo rounded out the team with their fifth and sixth respective appearances. Three teams, Indiana Pacers, Detroit Pistons, and Milwaukee Bucks, had two representations at the All-Star Game with Miller/Davis, Hill/Stackhouse, and Allen/Robinson.

The Western Conference's leading vote-getter was Shaquille O'Neal, who earned his seventh consecutive All-Star Game selection with 1,807,609 votes. Jason Kidd, Kobe Bryant, Kevin Garnett, and Tim Duncan completed the Western Conference starting positions. Bryant, Garnett, and O'Neal were starters for the previous year's Western Conference team. Duncan became an All-Star Game starter for the first time after he was selected as a reserve in last year's game. The Western Conference reserves include two first-time selections, Rasheed Wallace and Michael Finley. The team is rounded out by Gary Payton, Chris Webber, John Stockton, Karl Malone, and David Robinson. Three teams, Los Angeles Lakers, Utah Jazz, and San Antonio Spurs, had two representations at the All-Star Game with Bryant/O'Neal, Malone/Stockton, and Duncan/Robinson.

Roster

Game

The Eastern Conference led in the first three minutes of the game but then the Western Conference took advantage and finished the first quarter leading 33-26.

The East tried to come back in the second quarter but the score at halftime the West was still ahead of five points, 64-59. The Eastern Conference tied the game at 91 with two minutes and eight seconds remaining in the third quarter.

Chris Webber made a buzzer-beater at the end of the quarter and the Western Conference took the lead 99-97. The West started the fourth quarter with an 8-0 run that determined the win.

The co-MVPs of the game (Shaquille O'Neal and Tim Duncan) combined for 46 points and 23 rebounds. It was the third time in All-Star Game history that two players won the MVP award. It also happened in 1959 (Bob Pettit and Elgin Baylor) and in 1993 (John Stockton and Karl Malone). O'Neal would later share an All-Star MVP award nine years later, this time with former Laker teammate Kobe Bryant, making him the only player to share All-Star MVP honors with another player twice.

The American anthem was sung by Al Green. The Canadian anthem was sung by The Moffatts.

Box score

Eastern Conference

Western Conference

''* starters

All-Star Weekend

Rising Stars Challenge

The Rising Stars Challenge featured the best first-year players ('Rookies') against the best second-year players ('Sophomores'). Al Attles and Bill Russell served as head coaches for the rookies and sophomores respectively.

 Antawn Jamison was unable to participate due to injury.

Slam Dunk Contest

Three-Point Contest

References

External links
Recap
Boxscore
2000 Slam Dunk Contest results

National Basketball Association All-Star Game
All-Star
Basketball competitions in Oakland, California
2000 in sports in California